Football Club Sports Réunis Haguenau is a French association football team founded in 1987 as a result of the merger of FC Haguenau 1900 and Sports Réunis Haguenau 1920. They are based in Haguenau, Alsace, France and currently play in the Championnat National 2, the fourth tier in the French football league system. They play at the Parc des Sports in Haguenau, which has a capacity of 5,000.

Players

Current squad

Season by season

References

External links
  

Association football clubs established in 1987
1987 establishments in France
Haguenau
Sport in Bas-Rhin
Football clubs in Grand Est